Deborra-Lee Furness  (born 30 November 1955) is an Australian actress and producer.  She is married to actor Hugh Jackman.

Early life
Furness was born in Annandale, a suburb of Sydney, New South Wales, and raised in Melbourne, Victoria. 

At the age of 18, Furness attended secretarial school to learn shorthand and typing after her mother advised her to have a back-up career if her acting ambitions didn't eventuate to anything. She then got a job as the assistant to John Sorell, the news director at Channel 9. Despite describing herself as "such a bog secretary", Furness has said she thoroughly enjoyed the urgency, the fast action and the high energy of the newsroom. After working in the newsroom for a year, Furness was asked to work on No Man's Land, the station's daytime current affairs program which produced exclusively by women and hosted by Mickie de Stoop. Furness started working on the show as a researcher before becoming an on-air reporter. After her work at Channel 9, Furness then travelled through Europe for one year.

She studied acting at the American Academy of Dramatic Arts in New York City, where she graduated in either 1981 or 1982. She performed on the stage in New York and played Kathleen, the Australian wife of Cole Gioberti (Billy Moses) on the television series Falcon Crest before returning to Australia to continue her acting career.

Career 
Furness rose to fame in 1988 when she starred in the movie Shame, for which she won Best Actor awards from the Film Critics Circle of Australia and Golden Space Needle. Other roles included an episode of Halifax f.p. and The Flying Doctors. In 1993, Furness appeared as Chrissy in the television mini-series Stark starring Ben Elton and Jacqueline McKenzie. In 1995 she featured in the film Angel Baby directed by Michael Rymer and starring Jacqueline McKenzie and John Lynch. The film followed the story of two schizophrenic people who met during therapy and fell passionately in love.

In 1995, she starred in the title role in the television series Correlli, where she met her future husband, Hugh Jackman.

From 1995 to 1996, Furness starred in television series Fire alongside Andy Anderson and Wayne Pygram. Furness played the role of Dolores Kennedy.

An adoptive mother of two, Furness is known for her work assisting orphans globally and streamlining international adoptions, especially in her native Australia where she is a patron, and one of the creators, of National Adoption Awareness Week. She has addressed the National Press Club of Australia on the subject of adoption laws in Australia. Furness is a patron of the Lighthouse Foundation for displaced children and International Adoption Families for Queensland. She is also a World Vision ambassador and serves on the Advisory Committee for Film Aid International, working with refugees throughout the world.

Personal life
Furness is married to actor Hugh Jackman. They met on the set of Australian TV show Correlli in 1995. The ceremony took place on 11 April 1996 at St. John's in Toorak, Victoria, a suburb of Melbourne. After going through two miscarriages, she adopted two children with Jackman: a son born in 2000 and a daughter born in 2005.

A portrait of Furness and Jackman by Paul Newton was a finalist in the 2022 Archibald Prize.

Honour
In 2014, Deborra-Lee Furness was named as the New South Wales Australian of the Year for her work in adoption campaigning.

Filmography

Film

Television

Awards
 1988 SIFF Award for the best actress in Seattle International Film Festival. 
 1988 Film Critics Circle of Australia Award for the best actress.
 1991 Silver Shell for the best actress in San Sebastián International Film Festival.

References

External links

National Adoption Awareness Week
World Wide Orphans Foundation

1955 births
Living people
Australian television actresses
Australian film actresses
Australian film producers
American Academy of Dramatic Arts alumni
Officers of the Order of Australia
20th-century Australian actresses
21st-century Australian actresses
Australian film studio executives
Australian expatriates in the United States